Fuscoptilia jarosi is a moth of the family Pterophoridae. It is found in South Korea.

Adults have been recorded in June.

References

Moths described in 1991
Exelastini